Sanctuary of Madonna del Castello is a Roman Catholic church in the town of Almenno San Salvatore, in the province of Bergamo, Lombardy, northern Italy. 

Churches in the province of Bergamo
Romanesque architecture in Lombardy